Rick Smith is an American businessman and author.

Smith graduated from the University of Florida with a B.S. in Finance. and earned an M.B.A. in Marketing and Strategy from the Kellogg School of Management.

In 2003, Smith co-authored The 5 Patterns of Extraordinary Careers with James Citrin. In 2009, Smith published The Leap: How 3 Simple Changes Can Propel Your Career from Good to Great.

Smith was the founder and CEO of World 50, an executive networking company.

References 

American business writers
University of Florida alumni
Kellogg School of Management alumni
Living people
Year of birth missing (living people)